Heterobrissus is a genus of echinoderms belonging to the order Spatangoida, family unknown.

Species:

Heterobrissus erinaceus 
Heterobrissus gigas 
Heterobrissus hemingi 
Heterobrissus hystrix 
Heterobrissus niasicus

References

Spatangoida
Echinoidea genera